The Expression Amrilato, known in Japan as , is a Japanese bishōjo visual novel developed by SukeraSparo in 2017. It's a romantic game that contains text in the international language Esperanto, which the game calls Juliamo. To advance, players need to learn Esperanto as they play.

The Japanese Esperanto Institute has collaborated with the developer SukeraSparo to translate Japanese phrases to Esperanto.

The developer's name is a coined word which is a translation of the Japanese word taiyaki in Esperanto: sukera (sugar) and sparo (sparidae, a species of fish).

A sequel called Distant Memoraĵo, known in Japan as Itsuka no Memorajxo ~Kotonoha Amrilato~ was released on 15 July 2021.

Plot 

A girl named Rin Takatō suddenly gets lost in another world, where no one speaks her language, Japanese, and all signs are in a foreign language, called Juliamo. Rin is in despair because of the language barrier, but she meets Ruka who helps her and takes her home. Meanwhile, Rin learns Juliamo and gradually draws closer emotionally to Ruka.

Characters

References

External links
MangaGamer.org

2017 video games
2019 video games
Android (operating system) games
Bishōjo games
Esperanto-language mass media
IOS games
Isekai
Language learning video games
LGBT-related video games
Video games developed in Japan
Visual novels
Windows games
Yuri (genre) video games
MangaGamer games